Nyemba may refer to:
 Nyemba language, a Bantu language of Angola
 Ganguela people, or Nyemba, an ethnic group of Angola
 Ngiyampaa, or Nyemba, an ethnic group of Australia
 , a river in Democratic Republic of Congo, tributary of the Lukuga River
 Nico Nyemba, Zimbabwe rugby player

See also 
 Niemba, a town in the Democratic Republic of Congo